Burgervlotbrug is a hamlet in the Dutch province of North Holland. It is a part of the municipality of Schagen, and lies about 15 km north of Alkmaar.

Burgervlotbrug is considered part of Burgerbrug. It has place name signs.

The village is named after a floating bridge ("vlotbrug" in Dutch) in the Noordhollandsch Kanaal. The bridge is still in operation. There is a little Mennonite church from 1869 which is nowadays a residential home.

References

Schagen
Populated places in North Holland